Harald Balslev cand.theol. (1867–1952) was a Danish writer and composer. Much of his musical output is liturgical in nature.

Danish composers
Male composers
Danish male writers
1867 births
1952 deaths